Ropalidia sumatrae, the Sumatran paper wasp, is a species of paper wasp in the subfamily Polistinae. It has been recorded in Singapore, Malaysia, Indonesia, Thailand, and Vietnam.

References 

Vespidae
Insects described in 1801